The Short & Curlies is a 1987 short film written and directed by Mike Leigh. It stars Alison Steadman, Wendy Nottingham, Sylvestra Le Touzel and David Thewlis.

Reception
The Short & Curlies was nominated for a BAFTA Award for Best Short Film.

References

External links

1987 films
British short films
Films directed by Mike Leigh
Films scored by Rachel Portman
1980s English-language films